Du Yuming (28 November 1904 – 7 May 1981), was a Kuomintang field commander. He was a graduate of the first class of Whampoa Academy, took part in Chiang's Northern Expedition, and was active in southern China and in the Burma theatre of the Sino-Japanese War. After the Japanese surrendered in 1945, he was an important commander in the Chinese Civil War.

From 1945-47 Du commanded Nationalist forces in Northeast China and won several important battles against Communist forces there, including defeating the Communist general Lin Biao twice at Siping. Despite his successes, Chiang relieved him from command in 1947, after which Communist forces quickly took control of the region.

Du was captured later in the civil war and spent a decade as a prisoner of war. He was released in 1959, and given a position in the Communist government.

Biography

Early military career
A trusted protégé of Chiang Kai-shek, Du was a graduate of the first cadet class at the Whampoa Military Academy. During the Second Sino-Japanese War, he was the creator and first commander of the 200th Division, China's first mechanized division, and later commanded the KMT 5th Army in the First Changsha Campaign, and Battle of South Guangxi.

During World War II, he commanded the same 5th Army of the Nationalist Central Army of the Chinese Expeditionary Force in Burma in the Battle of Yunnan-Burma Road from mid March to early June 1942, during the Burma Campaign under Lieutenant General Joseph Stilwell. When the British Army collapsed and abandoned Burma under Japanese pressure, Du was forced to order a hastily planned withdrawal that resulted in the loss of 50,000 Chinese soldiers. Du fell back to China despite General Sun Li-Jen's advice that, because the route back to China was hazardous, he should instead retreat with the British to India. Most of the men who followed Du died in the Burmese jungle of tropical disease and starvation or were killed by Axis forces, while Sun's army retreated in an orderly fashion into India. Because he was acting on the orders of Chiang Kai-shek when he withdrew to China, he was not punished for the outcome of the campaign.

Chinese Civil War
After the war, Du helped strengthen the Nationalist position in the Southwest by removing Long Yun, the local warlord of Yunnan, in October 1945. Du was then transferred to the Northeast Theatre to consolidate Kuomintang control. After the civil war resumed in 1945, Du was able to win a number of victories.

In November 1945 he retook strategic positions around Shanhaiguan from Communist forces. Later, on November 22, he retook the strategic city of Jinzhou, which forced Communist forces to temporarily abandon any attempts to take major cities in the region and to agree to a temporary ceasefire. Fighting resumed in April 1946, and in May Du defeated Lin Biao in the Battle of Siping. Following the Communist withdrawal he pursued them, capturing Gongzhuling on May 21 and Changchun on May 23. His advance was eventually halted at the south bank of the Songhua River due to concerns about overextending his forces. Du's victory in Siping led to a general ceasefire across China brokered by George Marshall, during which Du consolidated his communication and supply lines.

The ceasefire held in Northeast China until January 1947, when Du led the majority of his forces to attack Communist forces on the Korean border in January 1947. When Du led his forces south, Lin Biao ordered 20,000 of his soldiers to cross the Songjiang River, where they staged guerrilla raids, ambushed relief forces, attacked isolated garrisons, and avoided decisive confrontations with strong and well-prepared armies that Du had sent to counterattack them. While the Communists did so they looted large quantities of supplies and destroyed the infrastructure of the KMT-held territories that they passed through, including bridges, railroads, fortifications, electrical lines, and boats. When Du sent forces north, Communist forces in the south advanced and besieged Du's forces at Tonghua. When Du sent his forces back south to attack the Communist headquarters at Linjiang, they fell into an ambush and were destroyed. When Du requested reinforcements from Chiang Kai-shek, his request was rejected.

Following his forces' defeat in the summer of 1947, Du reorganized his forces into six divisions, and focused on the defense of Changchun, Jilin City, Siping (which was already under siege) and West Liaoning, which was necessary to maintain communication with Beiping and Nanjing. By focusing on defense he effectively adopted a reactionary position and lost the initiative of the campaign.

On June 11 Lin's forces returned to Siping and began to engage and besiege it. Du's commander in the siege of Siping was Chen Mingren, who commanded 29,000 soldiers. Before Lin's forces arrived, Chen was able to entrench his forces in strong positions, and the first waves of Communist attackers suffered heavy casualties. The defenders in Siping also benefited from effective air support. The Communists were able to break into the city twice, but were driven back both times with heavy casualties. By mid-June the attackers were beginning to suffer from attrition and exhaustion, and by June 24 Nationalist reinforcements began to arrive from Hebei, and from Du's garrisons in other areas. On July 1 the siege was broken and the attackers were ordered to retreat north of the Songjiang river.

The Communists suffered between 13,000-40,000 casualties (depending on the source), while the Nationalist garrison at Siping was reduced to slightly over 3,000 men. Nationalist sources also reported that they had captured 94,000 enemy soldiers, and that 143,000 men in Lin's army had defected. Communist sources confirm slightly lower rates of desertion, with some divisions reporting a desertion rate of over 20%. Chiang Kai-shek interpreted the battle as decisive victory, but recalled Du from the Northeast and replaced him with Chen Cheng, who was one of Chiang's favourite generals. After Du's victory at Siping, Chiang may have sent Chen to the Northeast in order for Chen to have what Chiang believed would be the "final blow" against Lin. Shortly after Du was recalled, Lin Biao defeated Chen, taking control of Manchuria in 1948.

When the military situation in Xuzhou got serious, he was extracted from North East China and flown to Xuzhou as Deputy Commander of Xuzhou Bandit Suppression Headquarters to rescue Huang Baitao's Army Group. He was unable to do so and he himself was besieged as he attempted to breakout to the Yangtze. After 66 days of intense combat, he was finally defeated and Chiang's forces North of the Huai river were completely annihilated.

Capture and exoneration 
After the Battle of Huaihai, Du was taken prisoner and later held in Beijing's Gongdelin Re-education prison until 1959 as a war criminal. In 1959, Chairman Mao pardoned and released him along with Wang Yaowu, Song Xilian and several other former ROC Army generals. He was given a position in government as an official historian and died in 1981.

See also
Sun Liren
New 1st Army
Yang Chen-Ning, once son-in-law of Du

References

External links
 https://web.archive.org/web/20090326011824/http://cgsc.leavenworth.army.mil/carl/download/csipubs/bjorge_huai.pdf

1904 births
1981 deaths
Chinese military personnel of World War II
Chinese prisoners of war
National Revolutionary Army generals from Shaanxi
Whampoa Military Academy alumni
People from Yulin, Shaanxi
Chinese non-fiction writers